The Mangatokerau River is a river of the Gisborne Region of New Zealand's North Island. It flows generally southeast to meet the Uawa River, which it joins  from the latter's Tolaga Bay mouth.

See also
List of rivers of New Zealand

References

Rivers of the Gisborne District
Rivers of New Zealand